"Forgive Me" is a song by English singer Lynden David Hall. It was released on 28 January 2000 and reached number 30 on the UK Singles Chart. It was also featured on the soundtrack of the film Goodbye Charlie Bright (2001).

References

2000 singles
2000 songs
Song articles with missing songwriters